Jim Pressel (born July 19, 1963) is an American politician who has served in the Indiana House of Representatives from the 20th district since 2016.

References

1963 births
Living people
Republican Party members of the Indiana House of Representatives
21st-century American politicians